The 2017–18 Premier League of Bosnia and Herzegovina, known as Liga 12 and also known as BH Telecom Premier League for sponsorship reasons, was the eighteenth season of the Premier League of Bosnia and Herzegovina, the highest football league of Bosnia and Herzegovina. The season began on 22 July 2017 and concluded on 20 May 2018, with a winter break between early December 2017 and late February 2018.

Teams
A total of 12 teams will contest the league, including 10 sides from the 2016–17 season and two promoted from each of the second-level league.

Stadiums and locations

Personnel and kits

Note: Flags indicate national team as has been defined under FIFA eligibility rules. Players and Managers may hold more than one non-FIFA nationality.

Regular season

The season has a two-stage format. In the regular season, each of the 12 teams play home-and-away once, resulting in 22 games played each. The top six teams in the regular season qualify for the Championship round, the bottom six teams qualify for the Relegation round. Each team then plays home-and-away against the other teams within their own group, for an additional ten games played each, a season total of 32 games.

League table

Results

Championship round

Table

Results

Relegation round

Table

Results

Licensing issues 
All clubs in Bosnia and Herzegovina must have a license to compete in the Premier League of Bosnia and Herzegovina with the deadline this season being set May 7 for the First Degree commission. Five clubs did not get their licences for the first degree: Borac Banja Luka, Sloboda Tuzla, Čelik Zenica, Vitez and GOŠK Gabela. The Second Degree commission convened on May 24 and only approved Čelik before being abruptly cancelled and rescheduled for May 30. The commission approved all other clubs except for Borac, meaning that they would be relegated into the First League of the Republika Srpska. As Borac did not have the license but Čelik did, they were allowed to stay in the Premier League.

Borac attempted to solve the issues which caused the license removal, including removing the debt Borac owed to FK Džaja. Borac showed the evidence it showed regarding the payments to Džaja to UEFA, which will assist the Football Association of Bosnia and Herzegovina regarding the decision of whether or not Borac Banja Luka or Čelik Zenica will compete in the 2018–19 Premier League of Bosnia and Herzegovina. The debate over the licences also caused the draws for the next season to be rescheduled.

In a similar way, teams promoted from the First League of the Republika Srpska or First League of the Federation of Bosnia and Herzegovina also need to get a license separated into First and Second Degree commissions, although their deadlines are moved to a later date. The winners of both leagues FK Sloga Simin Han (later known as Tuzla City) and FK Zvijezda 09 met with the First Degree commission on June 14, but only Sloga received their license. Zvijezda 09 will convene at a later date with the Second Degree commission.

Top goalscorers

References

External links

2017-18
Bosnia
1